In quantum chemistry, the Dyall Hamiltonian is a modified Hamiltonian with two-electron nature. It can be written as follows:

The Dyall Hamiltonian behaves like the true Hamiltonian inside the CAS space, having the same eigenvalues and eigenvectors of the true Hamiltonian projected onto the CAS space.

References

Quantum chemistry